Two referendums were held in San Marino on 2 June 2019. One was a popular initiative on amending the electoral system to require a second round to be held thirty days after a general elections between the top two parties only if neither are able to form a coalition government. The other was on a constitutional amendment proposed by the captain regent that would add sexual orientation to the list of discriminations prohibited by law. This followed a vote by the Grand and General Council on the amendment failing to meet the two-thirds quorum.

Both proposals were approved by voters.

Results

See also
LGBT rights in San Marino

References

San Marino
2019 in San Marino
2019
June 2019 events in Europe
LGBT rights in San Marino